A coin is a small, flat, round piece of metal or plastic that is used as money.

Coin or Coins may also refer to:

Places

Europe
 Coín, a town and municipality in Málaga province, Spain
 Coin-lès-Cuvry, a municipality in Moselle
 Coin-sur-Seille, a municipality in Moselle
 Mont Coin, a mountain in Savoie

North America
 Coin, Arkansas, an unincorporated community
 Coin, Iowa, a city
 Coin, Kentucky, an unincorporated community
 Coin, Missouri, a ghost town
 Coin, Nevada, an unincorporated community

People with the name
 Coin (surname)

Arts, entertainment, and media
 COIN (band), an American indie pop band, and their album COIN
 Coin Coin, a musical work by Matana Roberts
 Coins (suit), a card suit in Latin-suited playing cards
 Coins, the currency of the Mario franchise
 Master of Coin, a fictitious role represented on the King's Small Council, e.g., by Petyr Baelish, in Game of Thrones
 President Alma Coin, a character in The Hunger Games novels
 Coin, a character in the Terry Pratchett novel Sourcery

Tarot
 Suit of Coins, a card suit used in tarot
 Ace of Coins, the ace card from the suit Suit of Coins
 Two of Coins, the second card from the Suit of Coins
 Three of Coins, the third card from the Suit of Coins
 Four of Coins, the fourth card from the Suit of Coins
 Five of Coins, the fifth card from the Suit of Coins
 Six of Coins, the sixth card from the Suit of Coins
 Seven of Coins, the seventh card from the Suit of Coins
 Eight of Coins, the eighth card from the Suit of Coins
 Nine of Coins, the ninth card from the Suit of Coins
 Ten of Coins, the tenth card from the Suit of Coins
 Knight of Coins, the knight card from the Suit of Coins
 Queen of Coins, the queen card from the Suit of Coins
 King of Coins, the king card from the Suit of Coins

Science and technology
 Coin, a digital device; the startup company behind it was acquired by Fitbit
 Coin, a unit of cryptocurrency
 Coin3D, a 3D computer graphics application programming interface
 Conical intersection, or COIN

Other uses
 Coin (department store), an Italian department store chain
 Coin, to make a new word or phrase; see Neologism

See also
 COIN (disambiguation)
 Coinage (disambiguation)
 Coining (disambiguation)
 Quoin (disambiguation), pronounced like coin
 Specie (disambiguation), meanings include coin, or commodity money